Moses Zarak Khan (born 12 April 1966) is a Fijian middle-distance runner. He competed in the men's 1500 metres at the 1988 Summer Olympics.

References

External links

1966 births
Living people
Athletes (track and field) at the 1988 Summer Olympics
Fijian male middle-distance runners
Olympic athletes of Fiji
Place of birth missing (living people)